LG5 or variation, may refer to:

 Chevrolet LG5, a Chevrolet small-block engine
 General Motors LG5, a General Motors 60° V6 engine
 Laminin G domain 5 (LG5)
 Norinco LG5 / QLU-11 (LG5), semiautomatic grenade launcher
 Lower Group 5, of the Bushveld Igneous Complex
 Yonghe Yongping Elementary School metro station (station code LG05) on the Wanda–Zhonghe–Shulin line in New Taipei, Taiwan
 Cēsis District (LG05), Latvia; see List of FIPS region codes (J–L)

See also

 Joanne (album) (#LG5), Lady Gaga's 5th studio album
 LG (disambiguation)
 LGV (disambiguation)